Smithfield-Selma High School is a public high school located in Smithfield, North Carolina. It is locally referred to as simply "SSS" (pronounced 'Triple S'). The school is part of Johnston County Schools.

History

Smithfield-Selma High School opened its doors in September 1969 and graduated its first class in June 1970. The school opened with about 1400 students in grades 10 through 12. There were 34% black and 66% white. There were 75 faculty members and support staff, two assistant principals, two secretaries and a bookkeeper.

The creation of the school proved to be particularly challenging due to the merging of six high schools. Two of the high schools had been only for black students, while four of the high schools had been predominantly white. The schools were: the Bulldogs of Richard B. Harrison, the Red Devils of Smithfield, the Hawks of Johnston Central, the Yellow Jackets of Selma, the Green Waves of Wilson's Mills, and the Pirates of Corinth Holder.

The school's first principal was Charles T. Tucker who brought order out of the chaos. He had new ideas, determination, a belief in people, confidence in the abilities of the youth and a willingness to listen and to understand even when he disagreed. The SSS Football Stadium is in his honor, named the Charles T. Tucker Stadium.

The school had a sound vocational program with courses in cosmetology, electronics, auto mechanics, drafting, business and more. It also had a first class academic program. It has a rich tradition of athletics with many conference and district championships. The AP program came into existence around 1975. In 1975 freshmen came to Smithfield-Selma and it was no longer a senior school. There were over 113 students enrolled in NJROTC and the Drill Team competed and won many championships. The Band program was the pride of the community and was later in the school's history led by local legend John R. "Doc" Windley.

Notable alumni
 Barry Foote  Major League Baseball catcher for the Montreal Expos, Chicago Cubs, Philadelphia Phillies and New York Yankees

References

External links
 Smithfield-Selma High School web site

Educational institutions established in 1969
Public high schools in North Carolina
Schools in Johnston County, North Carolina
1969 establishments in North Carolina